Design rules are maintained and released by a semiconductor foundry for its customers (layout designers of integrated circuits) to follow.  Restrictive design rules (RDRs) curtail some of the "freedom" layout designers have traditionally had with regular design rules in less advanced process technologies.  To achieve and maintain an acceptable return on investment for its customers and by extension for itself, a foundry may be compelled, for technological reasons, to adopt RDRs to better ensure the completed layout design of an integrated circuit is manufacturable with a desired yield in more advanced process technologies.

External links
 Gartner's Smith calls for 'restrictive design rules' at 32-nm
 Beyond DFM: battle lines forming over restrictive design rules
 'Restrictive design rules' at 32-nm technology

Semiconductor device fabrication